Usagi Yojimbo Book 26: Traitors of the Earth is the twenty-sixth graphic novel in the ongoing Usagi Yojimbo series created by cartoonist Stan Sakai. It was published by Dark Horse Comics in 2012, collecting stories previously published in Usagi Yojimbo (vol. 3) #117–123 and stories from Dark Horse Maverick 2001 #1 and MySpace Dark Horse Presents #35.

The single page story Groo VS. Usagi: Who Would Win? was originally published in the 38th annual Souvenir Book for the 2007 Comic-Con International: San Diego.

Traitors of the Earth was published in trade paperback and limited edition hardcover (limited to 350 signed and numbered copies).

Publication details

Trade Paperback Edition 

Publication Date: July 4, 2012

Format: b&w, 200 pages; HC, 

Price: $16.99

Signed & Numbered Limited Hardcover Edition 

Publication Date: July 4, 2012

Format: b&w, 200 pages; HC, 

Price: $59.99

Table of Contents 

 Introduction by Walt Simonson
 Usagi and the Kami of the Pond
 Cut the Plum
 Traitors of the Earth
 What the Little Thief Heard	
 The Hidden Fortress
 A Place to Stay
 The Death of Lord Hikiji
 Story Notes
 Groo VS. Usagi: Who Would Win?
 Cover Gallery
 Author Bio

Foreign Language Editions

Usagi Yojimbo 26: Zdrajcy ziemi 

Publisher: Egmont Polska Sp. z o.o.

Publication Date: kwiecień 2013

Language: Polish

Usagi Yojimbo nº 26: Traidores de la Tierra 

Publisher: Planeta DeAgostini

Publication Date: Febrero 2013

Language: Spanish

Usagi Yojimbo Tome 26 

Publisher: Paquet

Publication Date: Septembre 2015

Language: French

Format: 12,5 x 18,5 cm

The Digest sized French editions of the Usagi Yojimbo books do not feature any of the individual compilation titles that are used for the original English editions, listed each book by volume number instead.

References

2013 graphic novels
Usagi Yojimbo